Symplecta is a genus of crane fly in the family Limoniidae.

Species
Subgenus Hoploerioptera Alexander, 1953
S. honshuensis (Alexander, 1958)
S. luctuosipes Alexander, 1953
S. shikokuensis Alexander, 1953
Subgenus Podoneura Bergroth, 1888
S. anthracogramma (Bergroth, 1888)
S. apphidion (Alexander, 1958)
S. bequaertiana (Alexander, 1930)
S. brevifurcata (Alexander, 1930)
S. harteni Hancock, 2006
S. peregrinator (Alexander, 1944)
S. triangula (Alexander, 1975)
Subgenus Psiloconopa Zetterstedt, 1838
S. alexanderi (Savchenko, 1973)
S. beringiana Savchenko, 1979
S. bispinigera (Alexander, 1930)
S. bisulca (Alexander, 1949)
S. bizarrea (Stary, 1992)
S. cancriformis (Alexander, 1975)
S. carsoni (Alexander, 1955)
S. churchillensis (Alexander, 1938)
S. cramptonella (Alexander, 1931)
S. denali (Alexander, 1955)
S. diadexia (Alexander, 1966)
S. dorothea (Alexander, 1914)
S. ecalcar (Alexander, 1949)
S. epicharis (Alexander, 1966)
S. fausta (Alexander, 1957)
S. fenestrata (de Meijere, 1913)
S. gobiensis (Alexander, 1922)
S. hirsutissima (Alexander, 1966)
S. hygropetrica (Alexander, 1943)
S. irata (Alexander, 1949)
S. janetscheki (Alexander, 1968)
S. laevis (Alexander, 1930)
S. laticeps (Alexander, 1916)
S. laudatrix (Alexander, 1947)
S. lindrothi (Tjeder, 1955)
S. lucia (Alexander, 1914)
S. luliana (Alexander, 1934)
S. mafuluensis (Alexander, 1948)
S. mckinleyana (Alexander, 1955)
S. megarhabda (Alexander, 1943)
S. meigeni (Zetterstedt, 1838)
S. microcellula (Alexander, 1914)
S. neomexicana (Alexander, 1929)
S. nigrohalterata (Alexander, 1958)
S. peayi (Alexander, 1948)
S. polycantha (Alexander, 1945)
S. preclara (Alexander, 1964)
S. preclaroides (Alexander, 1964)
S. propensa (Alexander, 1935)
S. punctulata (de Meijere, 1919)
S. pusilla (Schiner, 1865)
S. rainieria (Alexander, 1943)
S. recurva (Alexander, 1949)
S. rutshuruensis (Alexander, 1956)
S. shoshone (Alexander, 1945)
S. sinawava (Alexander, 1948)
S. sparsa (Alexander, 1919)
S. stictica (Meigen, 1818)
S. sweetmani (Alexander, 1940)
S. sylleptor (Alexander, 1957)
S. taficola (Alexander, 1948)
S. telfordi (Alexander, 1948)
S. tridenticulata (Alexander, 1936)
S. trilaciniata Savchenko, 1982
S. verna (Alexander, 1920)
S. winthemi (Alexander, 1922)
S. yasumatsui (Alexander, 1954)
S. zukeli (Alexander, 1940)
Subgenus Symplecta Meigen, 1830
S. cana (Walker, 1848)
S. chosenensis (Alexander, 1940)
S. colombiana (Alexander, 1937)
S. echinata Stary & Brodo, 2009
S. edlundae Stary & Brodo, 2009
S. elongata Loew, 1874
S. grata Loew, 1873
S. holdgatei (Freeman, 1962)
S. horrida (Lackschewitz, 1964)
S. hybrida (Meigen, 1804)
S. mabelana (Alexander, 1955)
S. macroptera (Philippi, 1866)
S. novaezemblae (Alexander, 1922)
S. scotica (Edwards, 1938)
S. sheldoni (Alexander, 1955)
S. tripilata (Alexander, 1957)
Subgenus Trimicra (Osten Sacken, 1861)
S. antipodarum (Alexander, 1953)
S. brachyptera (Alexander, 1955)
S. campbellicola (Alexander, 1964)
S. confluens (Alexander, 1922)
S. inconstans (Alexander, 1922)
S. macquariensis (Alexander, 1962)
S. pilipes (Fabricius, 1787)

References

Limoniidae
Tipuloidea genera